Contin Island is an inhabited riverine islet in Ross and Cromarty within the Highland council area of Scotland.

Geography

The island is flat and lies between two arms of the Black Water. It is wooded at the northern and southern ends and at the centre is the parish church of Contin, dedicated to St Maelrubha or Máel Ruba and the old manse, surrounded by farm land. There has probably been a church on this site since the 7th or 8th century and there is a reference to it in 1227. The present church building dates from 1490, the former church having been burned by the MacDonalds sometime between 1482 and 1488. It was repaired and altered around 1832. There are two stones in the churchyard dating to about 1200.

The church is constructed of rubble walls with a slate roof, and the 19th century reconstruction followed the design of William Thomson. It has arched doors, windows with lattice glazing and a birdcage bell-cot on the west gable.

The manse, constructed in 1794 and enlarged in the 19th century, is located to the south of the church. It is now a private dwelling.

Inhabitation
Although it is clear from photographic evidence that the island is inhabited, at least from time to time, it was not listed as such by the census in 2001. However, the manse is a full-time family home.

See also
 List of freshwater islands in Scotland

Gallery

Footnotes 

River islands of Scotland
Populated places in Ross and Cromarty